Tatarsk (Tatarka) is a town in Novosibirsk Oblast, Russia, located  west of Novosibirsk, the administrative center of the oblast. Population:    31,000 (1974). The town got a Kazakh community.

History
It was founded in 1911 by merging the settlements of Staraya Tatarka and Stantsionny. It was granted town status in 1925.

Administrative and municipal status
Within the framework of administrative divisions, Tatarsk serves as the administrative center of Tatarsky District, even though it is not a part of it. As an administrative division, it is incorporated separately as the Town of Tatarsk—an administrative unit with the status equal to that of the districts. As a municipal division, Tatarsk is incorporated within Tatarsky Municipal District as Tatarsk Urban Settlement.

Climate

References

Notes

Sources

External links
Unofficial website of Tatarsk

Cities and towns in Novosibirsk Oblast